Khalifa Suleiman Khalifa (born 9 August 1956) is a Tanzanian CUF politician and Member of Parliament for Gando constituency since 1995.

References

Living people
1956 births
Civic United Front MPs
Tanzanian MPs 1995–2000
Tanzanian MPs 2000–2005
Tanzanian MPs 2005–2010
Tanzanian MPs 2010–2015
Gando Secondary School alumni
Alumni of the University of Exeter
Zanzibari politicians